Proposal Rocks is the name of a 29.9 acre nature preserve owned by Joshua's Trust in that features a group of granite boulders. It was donated to Joshua's Trust in 2003, and in 2009 was connected to 134-acre Coney Rock preserve by a 5.9 acre space of land.

The site was named Proposal Rocks because the previous owner Leonora Mullane's parents had gotten married in that spot.

References

Protected areas of Tolland County, Connecticut
Mansfield, Connecticut
Nature reserves in Connecticut
Protected areas established in 2003
2003 establishments in Connecticut